Tablet-K is a kosher certification agency that was under the leadership of Rabbi Rafael Saffra until his death in 2009.

Supervision and certification
Tablet-K products are commonly available at Costco, often for dairy and fish products. Many cheeses produced by Cabot Creamery have a Tablet-K hechsher. In 2006, Cabot Creamery expanded its line of kosher products, with some cheeses receiving a Tablet-K certification.

The Tablet-K hechsher is generally not regarded as reliable by Orthodox Jews, with cheeses and meats considered especially problematic. Many Conservative congregations also do not regard Tablet-K as reliable.

See also
Hechsher
Kashrut
Kosher foods

References

External links
Status of Keilim Used With Tablet-K Cheese, YC Torah Rosh Yeshiva

Consumer symbols
Kosher dairy
Kosher food certification organizations